The silver seatrout (Cynoscion nothus), also known as white trout, sugar trout, and silver weakfish, is a marine fish of the drum family Sciaenidae.

Distribution
The species is found in the western Atlantic, across the eastern areas of coastal North America and in the Bahamas. It occurs in marine and brackish areas normally at depths of 2–18 m, reaching 30 m on occasion. The fish looks like a weakfish or speckled trout without specks or spots across the back. This fish is often easily confused with the sand seatrout. One of the main habitat differences between the two is that this species is more often found in relatively deeper water.

Description
Silver seatrout are largely silver with a dusky gray back and a white belly. Like many weakfish species, they have vampire-like fangs on their upper jaw, well as smaller teeth throughout the entire mouth. Their mouths are also often a bright yellow. Their fins are tinged yellow, except for the upper dorsal fin, which matches the gray color of the back. Adults have an average length of 14–17 cm, and uncommonly up to 36 cm. Individuals generally have a maximum lifespan of two years.

Diet
Silver seatrout diets consist of crustaceans and small fish.

References

Sciaenidae